Gnodde is a surname. Notable people with the surname include: 

Jamie Gnodde (born 1995), English cricketer
Richard Gnodde (born 1960), South African banker